Conopias is a genus of birds in the tyrant flycatcher family Tyrannidae.

Species
The genus contains the following four species:

References

 
Bird genera
Taxonomy articles created by Polbot